The Sioux City Indians were a minor league baseball team that played in the Western League from 1914 to 1919. They were based in Sioux City, Iowa.

Year-by-year record

References

Baseball teams established in 1914
Baseball teams disestablished in 1919
Defunct baseball teams in Iowa
1914 establishments in Iowa
1919 disestablishments in Iowa
Defunct Western League teams
Sports in Sioux City, Iowa